Melanderia mandibulata is a species of long-legged fly in the family Dolichopodidae.

References

Hydrophorinae
Articles created by Qbugbot
Insects described in 1922
Taxa named by John Merton Aldrich
Diptera of North America